Imperial Aramaic is a Unicode block containing characters for writing Aramaic during the Assyrian and Achaemenid Persian Empires.

History
The following Unicode-related documents record the purpose and process of defining specific characters in the Imperial Aramaic block:

References 

Unicode blocks
Aramaic alphabet
Persian scripts